Wenderson da Silva Soares (born 19 May 1992 in Cajapió), commonly known as Maranhão, is a Brazilian footballer who plays as a forward for 4 de Julho.

Club career
He as also played for Fluminense de Feira.

References

External links

Maranhão at ZeroZero

1992 births
Living people
Sportspeople from Maranhão
Brazilian footballers
Association football forwards
Campeonato Brasileiro Série B players
Campeonato Brasileiro Série C players
Campeonato Brasileiro Série D players
Cruzeiro Esporte Clube players
Nacional Esporte Clube (MG) players
Villa Nova Atlético Clube players
Ceará Sporting Club players
Fortaleza Esporte Clube players
América Futebol Clube (MG) players
Club Sportivo Sergipe players
Allsvenskan players
BK Häcken players
KF Vllaznia Shkodër players
Águia de Marabá Futebol Clube players
Agremiação Sportiva Arapiraquense players
Guarany Sporting Club players
4 de Julho Esporte Clube players
Brazilian expatriate footballers
Brazilian expatriate sportspeople in Sweden
Expatriate footballers in Sweden
Expatriate footballers in Albania
Brazilian expatriate sportspeople in Albania